Allan Olesen (born 25 January 1974) is a Danish former professional footballer who played as a defender. He started his career at Danish clubs Albertslund IF, Brønshøj BK and Akademisk Boldklub before he moved abroad to play for French club AS Saint-Etienne in 2000. After three years at the club, he moved back to Denmark to play for AaB in 2003.

On 22 January 2008 Olesen signed a 1-year contract with Vejle Boldklub running from 1 July 2008.

External links
 Vejle Boldklub profile
Danish national team profile
 AaB profile
Career stats at Danmarks Radio

References

1974 births
Living people
Danish men's footballers
AS Saint-Étienne players
AaB Fodbold players
Vejle Boldklub players
Danish expatriate men's footballers
Expatriate footballers in France
Ligue 1 players
Danish Superliga players
Association football fullbacks
Brønshøj Boldklub players
Association football defenders